Thomas "Tommy" Hobson (born June 8, 1982) is an American stage, film, and television actor and singer. He is best known for his roles as Shout in the Nick Jr. television series The Fresh Beat Band and its animated spin-off Fresh Beat Band of Spies and Bryce in the Nickelodeon television series That Girl Lay Lay. He has also starred in films such as Clubhouse Detectives (1996), Free Enterprise (1999), 12 Hour Shift (2020) and Ghosts of the Ozarks (2021).

He began acting when he was six years old, and received a BA in Theatre Studies from Yale University in 2004.

Career

Thomas Hobson appeared in The Hogan Family in the 1990s and in Malcolm in the Middle  in the early 2000s.

In 2005, Thomas Hobson performed in the play North Beach, written by Bill Swadley and directed by Taylor Nichols.  Billboard reported that his performance was convincing and skillful.

In 2006, he performed at the MaCadden Theatre in Los Angeles in a retelling of The Madwoman of Chaillot as set in post-Katrina New Orleans. L.A. Splash wrote that the cast gave strong performances.

In 2008, he performed in the Citykid the Musical, which received 6 NAACP Image Awards.

In 2009, Hobson appeared on The Fresh Beat Band as Shout the piano player and assistant leader for the band, which stars his character's three best friends, Kiki, Twist and Marina.

The show, Nickelodeon's "most-music" show aimed at preschoolers, catapulted Thomas Hobson to national fame among adolescents.  Thomas Hobson's performance on the musical show has been characterized by one reviewer as "cool beans" and was shot in Hollywood, California.

Since September 2021, Hobson stars in the Nickelodeon show, That Girl Lay Lay.

Television

Doctor Doctor (1 episode, 1990)
The Hogan Family (1 episode, 1991)
Dangerous Women (1991)
In Living Color (1 episode, 1992) (cameo)
Star Trek: Deep Space Nine (1 episode, 1993)
A Different World (2 episodes, 1993)
The Adventures of Brisco County, Jr. (1 episode, 1993)
The Faculty (1 episode, 1996)
Step by Step (2 episodes, 1997)
Michael Jordan: An American Hero (1999)
The Fresh Beat Band (all episodes, 2009–2013)
Fresh Beat Band of Spies (all episodes, 2015–2016)
Criminal Minds (1 Episode, 2013)
Dynasty (1 Episode, 2018)
Bunk'd (1 episode, 2021)
That Girl Lay Lay (2021)

Films

Clubhouse Detectives (1996)
Free Enterprise (1999)
Daydreams (2008)
Bar Starz (2008)
Set Apart (2009)
12 Hour Shift (2020)
 Ghosts of the Ozarks (2021)

Short films
Wrapped Up In You (2018)

Personal life
Hobson is openly gay. He currently resides in California with his husband Wilkie Ferguson, whom he has been with for fifteen years.

Awards and nominations

 1996, Young Artist Awards nomination, 'Best Performance in a TV Movie/Home Video', for Clubhouse Detectives

References

External links

American people of Armenian descent
American male voice actors
Living people
1982 births
Yale University alumni
20th-century American male actors
21st-century American male actors
American male television actors
American male stage actors
American male child actors